Jilyaale is a district located west of Jowhar the administrative region of Shabeellaha Hoose Region of Somalia. It was found by the Somali cleric Sheikh Hassan Barsane, who led a revolt against fascist Italian forces in Somalia, and the city was also his center.

References

Middle Shabelle